The Mark 39 torpedo was the first homing torpedo in United States Navy service to use a trailing wire for mid-course guidance through the submarine's fire control system. The Mark 39 was a Mark 27 Mod 4 torpedo converted for development of wire guidance techniques, which were eventually incorporated into the Mark 37 Mod 1 and the Mark 45. Due to this development, the Mark 39 was considered obsolete and the remaining inventory was scrapped.

References

Torpedoes
Torpedoes of the United States
Unmanned underwater vehicles